Assumption Indian Residential School (also called the Hay Lakes Residential School) was a part of the Canadian Indian Residential School System in Northwestern Alberta, Canada. The school was operated by the Roman Catholic Church, and open between 1951 and 1974. The school was located on the south end of the Hay Lakes reserve.

Following the opening of a day school at the nearby community of Habay in 1962, the Assumption school increasingly served as a residence for students attending the day school. In 1968 the school was turned into a day school, while continuing to provide boarding services for students who did not live in the community. In 1969, the federal government took over the operation of the residence, which was closed in 1974.

History 
Assumption (Hay Lakes) Indian Residential School was established in 1951 following a 1920 amendment to the Indian Act in Canada. Under this amendment to the act, First Nation children were forced to attend an Indian reservation school or a day School.

Assumption (Hay Lakes) Indian Residential School served as a boarding or residential school from 1951 until 1968 when it was turned into a day school.  Students at residential schools, such as Assumption, were oftentimes separated from their families for long periods of time. Once separated from their families, Indigenous children at residential schools were forbidden from acknowledging their Indigenous culture and speaking in their native languages. Residential schools did not provide proper education to the children that were forced to attend and instead served as a system to indoctrinate and assimilate Indigenous children, effectively erasing their ties to Indigenous culture.

The children that were forced to attend Assumption (Hay Lakes) Indian Residential School were mostly made up of the Dene Tha’ First Nation. The children here were forced to follow the Catholic Church and the United Church of Canada’s indoctrination. The United Church of Canada openly admits to its support for the government’s goals to assimilate and religiously indoctrinate First Nations peoples. The United Church of Canada issued a formal apology to the children who had been forced to attend residential schools in 1998. Unlike the United Church of Canada, the Catholic Church has refused to apologize for their involvement in the forced assimilation and indoctrination of Indigenous children.

Residential Schools, like Assumption (Hay Lakes) Indian Residential School, were put in place by Canada's federal government to indoctrinate children into a new Catholic or Christian culture. The federal government of Canada, at the time, believed the children to be uncivilized, arguing that the civilization of these children was necessary. The federal government of Canada aimed to weaken children's family ties and cultural linkages, hoping to break Indigenous children's generational customs, cultures, and practices. Assumption (Hay Lakes) Indian Residential School, like all other Indian residential schools, functioned in a manner meant to result in the "extinction of heathen practices".

The children that attended Assumption (Hay Lakes) Indian Residential School were forced to join the school during a time of change within the residential school system. It was not until the late 1950s that child labor was prohibited at residential schools when the federal government began playing a larger role in residential schools. The characteristics of the children who were forced to attend residential schools changed in the 1960s, making it so that more vulnerable children were forced to attend. Among the more vulnerable children were those with chronic conditions or children who would have been placed in foster care.

In 1968, Assumption (Hay Lakes) Indian Residential School was turned into a day school but continued to provide boarding services for children who did not live in the community. Unlike residential schools, day schools served as a school where children would attend during the day and return to their families in the afternoon. Despite the fact that most children were able to go home in the evenings at day schools, they still suffered the same types of abuse that they would at a residential school.

In 1969, the Department of Indian Affairs took control over the Residential Schools of Canada. The government effectively took exclusive control over residential schools, like Assumption (Hay Lakes) Residential School. It was then decided that assimilation tactics that the church had been using had not worked among Indigenous communities affected by residential schools. The government had full control over Assumption (Hay Lakes) Residential School and the school was later shut down in 1974. Residential schools began to shut down following the Canadian government’s attempt to integrate and desegregate education systems.

Government involvement 
In 1857, the Gradual Civilization Act was passed by the Canadian government, aiming to assimilate indigenous people into Canadian settler society. The government encouraged enfranchisement among Indigenous people at this time, which entailed an Indigenous person terminating their Indigenous status and becoming a Canadian citizen. The Gradual Civilization Act did not work among Indigenous communities in Canada, with many Indigenous people refusing to terminate their Indigenous status for the sake of enfranchisement. In response, in 1876 the Canadian government passed the Indian Act, which made enfranchisement compulsory. The act was later amended in 1920, making it compulsory for Indigenous children to attend residential or day schools. Under the 1920 amendment to the Indian Act Indigenous children were forced to attend residential schools and it was made illegal for Indigenous children to attend other schooling institutions.

The Canadian government worked along side churches in Canada in attempts to assimilate Indigenous people into white Canadian society. While the Canadian government initially had little involvement at residential schools, they eventually took full control over the residential schools. In the late 1950s, the Canadian government banned child labor at residential schools. In 1969, the Canadian government took full control over Residential Schools after realizing that the Church's involvement at residential schools had done little-to-nothing to help assimilate Indigenous children into white Canadian society. The last residential school was shut down in 1996.

Church involvement 
Assumption (Hay Lakes) Indian Residential School was run by the United Church of Canada and the Catholic Church, both of which were involved in the forced assimilation of about 150,000 children in Canada. Of the 150,000 children that were forced to attend residential schools like Assumption Indian Residential School, it is currently unknown how many students were forced to attend Assumption Indian Residential School.

The Church's involvement in the Residential school system aimed to assimilate and indoctrinate children while at residential schools. The Catholic and Christian churches were believed to be one of the actors that could bring about rapid assimilation and changes in values among Indigenous people. This belief was rooted in the idea that the Christian and Catholic churches had previous successes with assimilating Indigenous people in North America.

In 1875, Bishop Vital Grandin of the Roman Catholic Church, stated that the Church aimed to give Indigenous children a distaste for native life. The distaste for native life would then prompt humiliation in Indigenous children, aiming to assimilate Indigenous people so much that by the time they graduated from the school the only thing native about them was their blood.

Both the Catholic and the Christian church were involved in the educations of the Residential School system. It was not until 1969 that the churches' ceased to serve as main educators at residential schools, following the Canadian government's decision to become fully involved in controlling residential schools. The Catholic Church has yet to issue a public apology for their involvement in Canada's residential school system. In 1986, the United Church of Canada issued a public apology for their involvement in the residential school system where they stated that their involvement happened because of an attempt to try and make indigenous people like them.

Living conditions 
Residential schools, like Assumption (Hay Lakes) Indian Reservation School, were put in place by the Canadian government with the goal of assimilating Indigenous children into settler Canadian society. The Canadian government sought to force children to sever their ties to their Indigenous heritage and indoctrinate them into a new Euro-Canadian Christian society. The Canadian government sought out to assimilate as many Indigenous children as they could, deeming that all Indigenous children had to attend a residential or day school. Due to the goals that the Canadian government had in mind for residential Schools, these schools were often underfunded and overcrowded with a population of Indigenous children.

Coupled with the overpopulation and underfunding of residential schools, disease spread among Indigenous children rapidly, diseases such as: smallpox, measles, influenza and tuberculosis (TB). Diseases spread quickly amongst the children living at Residential Schools due to overcrowding and minimal efforts to slow the transmission of these diseases. It is reported that some Residential Schools had a mortality rate of about 60%. Most residential schools lacked or had limited access for testing for these diseases, especially tuberculosis, resulting in the deaths of thousands of Indigenous children.

The children were taught curriculums that did not have much educational value, with boys learning things like: carpentry or farming, and the girls being taught to cook, clean, and sew. Due to the technical education they were receiving at residential schools,  it was common for residential schools to employ Indigenous children to work at the schools.The boys at residential schools would work on things like maintenance and agriculture for the school, while the girls worked on the housekeeping of residential schools. Child labor at residential schools was not banned until the late 1950s, following changes to the reservation school system.

While at these schools, Indigenous children were often prohibited from speaking their native languages. There are reports from many Indigenous people who attended residential schools claiming that they were abused for speaking their native languages. Native languages and Indigenous practices were often prohibited at residential schools because those in charge aimed to sever Indigenous cultural ties. Indigenous children often fell victims to physical and mental abuse while at Residential Schools, resulting in a high death toll among Indigenous children at residential schools. Following a 1907 inspection of residential schools, it was reported that about 24% of children who had been previously healthy at Residential Schools were dying at alarming rates. Despite reports that there should be reform at residential schools the calls for reform often went unheard and ignored, resulting in a cycle of poor living conditions at residential schools.

Student deaths 
There were two student deaths at Assumption (Hay Lakes) Indian Residential School: Carmen Chonkolay and Lucie Semantha. Carmen Chonkolay died on December 19, 1968 and Lucie Semantha died on June 19, 1952. The cause of death for both Carmen and Lucie is currently unknown.

References

Catholic Church in Canada
First Nations education
Former education in Canada
Indigenous child displacement in Canada
Residential schools in Canada